Ridge is a village in the English county of Dorset. It is situated on the south bank of the River Frome, about half a mile due south east of the town of Wareham.

Ridge forms part of the civil parish of Arne, within the Purbeck local government district.

A wharf on the River Frome at Ridge was once a major transhipment point for Purbeck Ball Clay. The clay was brought to the wharf by the Furzebrook Railway, and transferred to barges for the voyage to Poole Harbour. The railway is now abandoned, and the wharf has become a marina.

External links

Isle of Purbeck
Villages in Dorset